Lakeside railway station is on the heritage Lakeside and Haverthwaite Railway in England. It was previously the terminus of the Furness Railway Ulverston to Lakeside Line, which was closed as part of the Beeching Axe in 1965. It serves the village of Lakeside in Cumbria, as well as the tourist attractions located there.

Location
Situated at the southern end of Windermere, the station has a direct interchange with the Windermere Lake Cruises ferry services to Ambleside and Bowness-on-Windermere.

The station is also located next to the Aquarium of the Lakes and a number of shops and cafes.

History

Trains were timed to coincide with sailings by the Windermere United Yacht Company from the adjacent pier. Within a few years the railway bought the yacht company.

Originally, the station had two platforms with an overall roof, a signal box, turntable and several sidings. The goods yard was able to accommodate most types of goods including live stock and was equipped with a three-ton crane.

As well as the standard gauge tracks the station had a narrow gauge tramway used for coaling lake steamers. A camping coach was positioned here by the London Midland Region from 1955 to 1957, two coaches were here from 1958 to 1964.

The station closed with the line on 6 September 1965. After services stopped, the station fell into disrepair, and in 1978, British Railways removed the roof and demolished the clock tower.

British Railways sold off the steamboat service to the Bowness Bay Boating Company who were still operating day trips on Windermere in 2020.

The station reopened as part of the heritage Lakeside and Haverthwaite Railway in 1973, with trains running to the nearby station of Haverthwaite, roughly an eighteen-minute journey.

Film locations 
The station has appeared in a number of film and TV scenes. In many appearances the station is titled 'Windermere', despite Windermere's own railway station being on the other side of the lake, on a different line.
 1973 film of Swallows and Amazons.  Although released in 1974, this was filmed in 1973, the preservation society's first year of operation.
 1980s TV Sherlock Holmes
 1988 film "Without A Clue" starring Ben Kingsley and Michael Caine
 1996 TV production of Agatha Christie's Poirot,  Dumb Witness

References

Sources

External links

The Lakeside & Haverthwaite Railway Official Site

Former Furness Railway stations
Furness
Tourist attractions in Cumbria
Lakeside and Haverthwaite Railway
Railway stations in Great Britain opened in 1872
Railway stations in Great Britain closed in 1965
Beeching closures in England
Heritage railway stations in Cumbria
Colton, Cumbria